The Amstel Gold Race is an annual one-day classic road cycling race held in the province of Limburg, Netherlands. It traditionally marks the turning point of the spring classics, with the climbers and stage racers replacing the cobbled classics riders as the favourites.

Since 1989 the event has been included in season-long competitions at the highest level of UCI, as part of the UCI Road World Cup (1989–2004), the UCI ProTour (2005–2010), UCI World Ranking (2009–2010) and since 2011 of the UCI World Tour. It is the only one-day World Tour race staged in the Netherlands and is considered the most important Dutch road cycling event. Dutchman Jan Raas holds the winning record with five victories.

Dutch beer brewer Amstel has served as the race's title sponsor since its creation in 1966. The name does not directly refer to the river Amstel, which runs through and near the city of Amsterdam. It took place without interruption until the COVID-19 pandemic.

Since 2017, a Women's Amstel Gold Race is held, after a 14-year hiatus. The event is organised on the same day and on largely the same roads as the men's race and is part of the UCI Women's World Tour.

History

The first race
The Amstel Gold Race was created by Dutch sports promoters Ton Vissers and Herman Krott, who ran a company called Inter Sport. Their dream was to create a Dutch classic cycle race able to compete with the monument races of Flanders and Italy. The first edition was announced to take place on 30 April 1966, the Netherlands' National Holiday. The plan was to start in Amsterdam, before branching out to the east of the country and finishing in Maastricht, in the southeast of the country, totalling 280 km.

However, many problems emerged. Krott and Vissers had neglected the many rivers along the route and miscalculated the zigzags needed to cross them, making the intended distance far longer than 280 km. New plans were made to start in Utrecht, then Rotterdam; and to stage an alternative finish in the small village of Meerssen in Limburg. Moreover, less than three weeks before the start, organizers realized they had not obtained permission to cross the Moerdijk Bridge, the only exit route out of Rotterdam. The route had to be redrawn again and the start was moved further south, to Breda. On top of all that, the Dutch militant hippy counterculture movement Provo had declared a state of anarchy in the Netherlands in 1966. Authorities feared that a race organized on the royal family's celebration day would cause possible uprisings.

Four days before the anticipated date, Vissers and Krott called off their race and were staging a press conference, when the Dutch roads ministry in The Hague called to say that the race could be organized after all — provided it would never again be scheduled on Queen's Day.

On Saturday 30 April 1966, the first Amstel Gold Race was raced from Breda to Meerssen, without serious incidents. Three riders from the Ford-France team sprinted for victory. Dutchman Jan Hugens suffered a mechanical failure in the final meters and was beaten by Frenchman Jean Stablinski who won the inaugural edition. At 302 km, it was the longest edition ever. There were 120 starters, of which only 30 finished. Despite its original intent, the Amstel Gold Race has never started in Amsterdam; nor in Rotterdam or Utrecht, three of The Netherlands' largest cities.

Search for identity
In 1967 the start location moved to Helmond, in front of sponsor Amstel's headquarters, and the distance was scaled back to 213 km. Arie den Hartog won the second edition, becoming the first Dutch winner. In 1968 the race took place on 21 September because of a calendar conflict; the only time the Amstel Gold Race was ever run in the autumn. Dutchman Harrie Steevens won the race over a distance of 254 km.

In 1969 the race returned to April. Guido Reybrouck won the fourth edition, the first in a series of Belgian wins. The race was affected by severe snow and hailstorms, forcing many riders to abandon due to hypothermia.

A young race, the Amstel Gold Race struggled to find its place on the international calendar between the much older cobbled classics and the Ardennes classics and had problems attracting the best riders. For several years, cycling great Eddy Merckx did not participate because organizers could not pay his starting fee. In 1973 race director Herman Krott agreed to pay a considerable sum to Merckx's team, provided that he would win the race. Merckx started and won the Amstel Gold Race more than three minutes ahead of the second-place finisher. Two years later, he was the first rider to win a second time.

In the late 1970s Dutchman Jan Raas won the Amstel Gold Race a record five times, of which four were consecutive. Raas was able to rely on his strong sprint finish, but also took two solo victories. Dutch media started coining the phrase Amstel Gold Raas. In 1983 Australian Phil Anderson became the first non-European winner.

Move to Maastricht
In 1991 the finish of the Amstel Gold Race moved to Maastricht, Limburg's capital city, and in 1998 the start also moved there. The character of the race was more and more defined by the hilly area in the south of the province. Only two Dutch riders, Michael Boogerd and Erik Dekker, have won the race in the last two decades before Mathieu van der Poel's win in 2019. Both Boogerd and Dekker beat American Lance Armstrong in a two-man sprint in Maastricht, in 1999 and 2001 respectively. The 2001 race only had 37 finishers of a 190-strong pack, the lowest number in modern times. Boogerd shares the record of seven podium finishes with Jan Raas, having achieved one victory, four-second places, two third places and several other top-ten finishes.

Cauberg finish
From 2003 to 2016, the finish was shortly after the top of the Cauberg climb in Valkenburg. Kazakh rider Alexander Vinokourov won the first uphill-finish edition with an attack before the Cauberg. In 2013 the finish was moved 1.8 km away from the top of the Cauberg, near the centre of Valkenburg, resulting in a mainly flat, straight finish. In 2017 the race organisers moved the finish so that the final climb of the Cauberg came 19 km from the finish, hoping for a "more open" race. The most successful rider in recent years has been classics specialist Philippe Gilbert. The Belgian won the race four times since 2010, basing his victories on late bursts of speed and power on the Cauberg. Therefore, earned the nickname of ‘Mister Cauberg’ and ‘Amstel Gilbert Race’ came up. In 2015 Polish rider Michał Kwiatkowski became the first reigning world champion to win the race since Bernard Hinault in 1981. Kwiatkowski won again seven years later, when he outsprinted Benoît Cosnefroy in the finish of the 2022 edition.

Route
Although the Netherlands are known for their flat, wind-affected roads, the Amstel Gold Race takes place in the hilly southern region of Limburg. The route twists through the rolling Limburg countryside, often turning abruptly to climb as many hills (bergs) as possible. The most notable climb is the Cauberg, which is covered up to three times, and has sometimes been in the last few kilometres of the race. The Keutenberg and the Eyserbosweg are two other renowned climbs of this race.

Course changes

Although the race is younger than many other cycling classics, the course changed considerably over the years.  The race's inaugural edition started in Breda in North Brabant, but quickly moved closer to the hilly region. From 1971 to 1997 the start was in Heerlen. The race started since 1998 on the central market square in Maastricht's Inner City and since 2019 on the bigger Vrijthof square.

Since 2005 the race is run entirely within the boundaries of Dutch Limburg, except right after the Vaalserberg climb, there is a short passage through Gemmenich in Belgium. Past editions had covered significant parts of Liège in Belgium, addressing the Côte de Hallembaye, meant to include a larger selection of climbs.

From 1991 until 2002 the race ended in Maastricht as well. The finish was on the Maasboulevard, keeping the flat run-in to the finish. In 2000 sprint specialist Erik Zabel won the race, leading out the sprint of a 20-strong group.

From 2003 to 2012 the finish was at the top of the Cauberg climb, in the Valkenburg municipality, close to Maastricht. The finale was redesigned in 2013 and the finish was moved west, to the hamlet of Vilt (Berg en Terblijt), 1.8 kilometres from the top of the Cauberg. The altered finish mirrors the location that was used for the 2012 UCI Road World Championships in Valkenburg. Since 2017 The last (4th) climb of the Cauberg was removed so that the Geulhemmerberg and Bemelerberg (7.4 km from the finish) are the last climbs now. It was done so that things would opened up more the character of the race.

Race characteristics

Ardennes Week

Although the race location in Limburg is not part of the Ardennes, neither geographically nor geologically, it is often considered the opening race of the Ardennes Week. In 2004 the Amstel Gold Race has swapped places with Liège–Bastogne–Liège on the international calendar. Ever since, the race is organised on the Sunday after the cobbled classic Paris–Roubaix and before the Ardennes classic Flèche Wallonne the next Wednesday.

Until 2002, the Amstel Gold Race had a flat run-in to the finish and was often won by riders excelling in the cobbled classics, notably the Tour of Flanders. In recent decades, organizers chose to shift the focus of the race to the hills and the character of the race changed. The peloton is usually made up of the same riders starting in the Ardennes races; classics riders with sufficient climbing abilities and even Grand Tour specialists.

The Dutch hills, in the very south of Limburg, are the Netherlands' only hilly region. The chalk–loess relief was formed by the foothills of the neighbouring Ardennes and Eifel low mountain ranges. The hills define the character of the race: they are generally shorter and not as high as in the Ardennes, but come in much higher frequency than in Liège–Bastogne–Liège. The highest point of the region and the race is Vaalserberg at 322.7 m above sea level; the top of the Cauberg is at 133.7 m altitude.

Hills

The present course features more than 30 short climbs which come in faster succession as the race progresses, meaning riders have little time to recover in between the hills. 25 climbs are covered in the last 165 kilometres of the race, with eight coming in the final 45 kilometres. The steepest are the Cauberg, Keutenberg and Eyserbosweg. Some ascents are as steep as 22% (Keutenberg), others are more gently sloped. In contrast to the cobbled bergs in the Tour of Flanders, all the hills in Limburg are asphalted nowadays.

Attempting to explain the difficulty of the course Peter Easton recounts a mathematician's calculations:
...applying logic to overcome a sense of incomprehension is the key to understanding this race. And there is truth in numbers. Six of the climbs come in the first 92 kilometers — one every 15.2 kilometres. The remaining 25 come over the final 165 kilometres. That's one every 6.6 kilometres. Breaking it down further, the final hour of racing has eight climbs in 42 kilometres. Now we're down to one every 5.25 km. At 40 km/h, that's one every 7 ½ minutes. Not overly funny, and definitely all business.

The hills in the 2015 Amstel Gold Race:

Nervous course
The race is the Netherlands' largest professional race but is frequently criticized for the danger of its course. The route runs on narrow roads, through often densely-populated suburbs and villages. Due to its high population density and the high cost of land, many Dutch houses do not have garages and cars are left parked in the street. Much of the course is urban, with many traffic-calming devices such as speed bumps, pinches, bollards, ramps, chicanes, refuge islands and roundabouts, prompting Scotland's Robert Millar to call it the Tour of the Roundabouts. Crashes are common in the race.

Winners, men

Multiple winners
Riders in italics are still active.

Wins per country

Women's race

From 2001 to 2003, three editions of the Amstel Gold Race for elite women were held. In 2003, it was part of the UCI Women's Road World Cup. The race started in Maastricht 30 minutes after the men's. It was run over 114 km, taking in nine climbs and similarly finishing on top of the Cauberg. The race was discontinued after the third edition, because organization on the same day and on largely the same roads as the men's race was considered too difficult on the irregular circuits.

After a 14-year hiatus, the women's race returned in 2017, organized on the same day as the men's race at approximately half the distance. Likewise, the race starts in Maastricht and finishes in Berg en Terblijt, Valkenburg. It features 17 categorized climbs, including four ascents of the Cauberg. Olympic road race champion Anna van der Breggen won the race with an attack at 8 km from the finish.

Cyclosportive
Since 2001 there is a Cyclosportive Amstel Gold Race, organized annually on the day before the professional event. Cycling fanatics and recreational bike riders can ride trajectories of 60, 100, 125, 150, 200 or 240 km. Every distance finishes on the location of the professional race, immediately after the climb of the Cauberg. The number of participants is restricted to 12,000, in order to secure riders' safety. In 2009 the official website crashed, because of a run on the tickets. In 2010 all 12,000 tickets were sold in just 38 minutes.

Notes

References

  Graat, John (April 16, 2005). De Gold Race is allang geen 'poenkoers' meer. Trouw (newspaper), p. 21.

External links

 
 Recaps of all Amstel Gold Races since 1974 (Flemish television)
 

 
Classic cycle races
Super Prestige Pernod races
UCI ProTour races
UCI Road World Cup races
UCI World Tour races
Recurring sporting events established in 1966
1966 establishments in the Netherlands
Cycle races in the Netherlands
Cycling in Limburg (Netherlands)
Cycling in Valkenburg aan de Geul
Sports competitions in Maastricht
South Limburg (Netherlands)